Drumfusion is an album by drummer and bandleader Chico Hamilton recorded in 1962 and released on the Columbia label.

Reception

The AllMusic review by Scott Yanow states: "The music is melodic at times but not boppish, free in spots but not avant-garde. This is a continually infectious and inspiring band".

Track listing
All compositions by Charles Lloyd
 "One for Joan" - 8:10
 "Freedom Traveler: Prayer/Journey" - 6:17
 "Tales" - 5:00
 "Homeward" - 6:03
 "A Rose for Booker" - 8:01
 "Transfusion" - 4:57

Personnel
Chico Hamilton - drums
Garnett Brown - trombone
Charles Lloyd - tenor saxophone, flute
Gábor Szabó - guitar
Albert Stinson - bass

References 

Columbia Records albums
Chico Hamilton albums
1962 albums
Albums produced by Irving Townsend
Albums produced by Teo Macero